see Lares (disambiguation) for namesakes
Lares was a city of Roman Africa, located at modern Henchir Lorbeus, Tunisia.

Ecclesiastical history 
The bishopric of Lares in the Late Roman province of Africa Proconsularis was a suffragan of its capital Carthage's Metropolitan Archbishopric, but like most was to fade.

The diocese was nominally restored as a Latin Catholic titular bishopric in the 18th century, until 1933 also called Lari in Curiate Italian.

It has had the following incumbents, of the lowest (episcopal) rank with two archiepiscopal (intermediary) exceptions:
 Bishop-elect Dionisio Francisco Mellado Eguíluz (1716.03.30 – ?)
 Juan Llano Ponte (1769.11.20 – 1791.09.26)
 Tommaso Gallarati Scotti (1794.02.21 – 1804.07.10)
 Domenico Lombardi (1821.08.13 – ?)
 Jules-François Philippe, Fransalians (M.S.F.S.) (1886.08.24 – 1904.04.16)
 Joaquim Antônio d’Almeida (1915.06.14 – 1947.04.01)
 Richard Henry Ackerman, Holy Ghost Fathers (C.S.Sp.) (1956.04.06 – 1960.04.04)
 Luis Aponte Martinez (1960.07.23 – 1963.04.16) (later Cardinal*)
 Titular Archbishop Rubén Isaza Restrepo (1964.01.03 – 1974.10.03)
 Justo Oscar Laguna (1975.02.01 – 1980.01.22)
 Eduardo Ernesto FuentesRuysschaert Duarte (1980.04.09 – 1982.10.18)
 Titular Archbishop Ambrose Battista De Paoli (1983.09.23 – 2007.10.10)
 William Patrick Callahan, Conventual Franciscans (O.F.M. Conv.) (2007.10.30 – 2010.06.11)
 Thomas Eusebios Naickamparampil (2010.07.14 – 2016.01.04), as first Exarch of the Syro-Malankara Catholic Apostolic Exarchate of the United States of America, until promoted first Eparch of St. Mary, Queen of Peace, of the United States of America and Canada

See also 
 List of Catholic titular sees

Source and External links 
 GCatholic with titular incumbent bio links

Catholic titular sees in Africa